Shahood Alvi (Punjabi, Urdu:شہود علوی) (born in Multan, Punjab) is a Pakistani television actor, Director and a Producer. He has been working in Pakistani television dramas since 1994.

He started work in TV industry as an assistant of sound mixer. He has worked in films and drama serials on many television channels.

During March 2010 Alvi visited the Karachi University, where he was attacked by the female students because of his negative role in the serial Bol Meri Machli.  According to Daily Nai Baat, he tried to ensure the students that the role has nothing to do with his real life but they didn't believe him and hurled eggs and shoes at him.

Personal life 
He marries Samia Alvi and has three daughters: Areeba Shahood Alvi, Sajal Shahood, and Areeja Shahood.

Filmography

Cinema
 Ramchand Pakistani

Television 
 Aao Laut Chalein
 Banna Mera Bara Anmol
 Bol Meri Machli
 Chanda 
 Chahatein
 Drama Fever (Aurat aur Char Dewari)
 Makan
 The 1st Indus Drama Awards
 Chat Se Chat Tak
 Chipkali - 2003
 Daray Daray Naina
 Dil Dard Dhuan
 Hai Mein Mari
 Mera Naam Hai Mohabbat
 Khushi Ek Roag
 Kiran Kahani
 Kitni Girhain Baqi Hain
 Ladies Park
 Main Haari
 Maseeha
 Maya
 Mera Saaein 2
 Mere Huzoor
 Meri Adhoori Mohabbat
 Mukmala Aur Mahira
 Nadamat
 Nanhi
 Noor Bano
 Shayad Ke Bahar Aaye
 Sheeshay Ka Mahal
 Vasl
 Meri Beti
 Teri Berukhi (Geo TV)
 Woh Dobara
 Zindagi Teray Bina
 Mujhe Much Kehna Hai
 Mere Khudaya
 Choti Choti Batain
 Tum Ho Wajah
 Ghisi Piti Mohabbat
 Dunk
 Azmaish
 Aye Musht-E-Khaak
 Kaisi Teri Khudgharzi

Accolades

References

External links 
 

Living people
Pakistani male television actors
Pakistani male film actors
Punjabi people
Male actors from Lahore
Year of birth missing (living people)